The Union of Croats of Romania (UCR; , ZHR) is an ethnic minority political party in Romania representing the Croatian community. Its headquarters are in Carașova.

History
The UCR contested the 1992 general elections, but received just 219 votes and failed to win a seat; the electoral law allowing political parties representing ethnic minority groups to be exempt from the electoral threshold only applied as long as they received 10% of the vote required for a single seat in the Chamber of Deputies. It again failed to win a seat in the 1996 elections as it received just 486 votes, but the 2000 elections saw the party receive 11,084 votes, winning a seat for the first time. It has won a seat in every election since.

Electoral history

References

External links
Official website

Non-registered political parties in Romania
Political parties of minorities in Romania